Justice Eakin may refer to:

John R. Eakin, associate justice of the Arkansas Supreme Court
Michael Eakin, associate justice of the Supreme Court of Pennsylvania
Robert Eakin, chief justice of the Oregon Supreme Court